Jorge Rivera may refer to:

 Jorge Rivera (basketball) (born 1973), basketball player from San Juan, Puerto Rico
 Jorge Rivera (wrestler), Mexican professional wrestler known as Skayde
 Jorge Rivera (fighter) (born 1972), American mixed martial artist
 Jorge Rivera (footballer, born 1978), Colombian football goalkeeper
 Jorge Rivera (footballer, born 1996), Puerto Rican football midfielder
 Jorge B. Rivera (1935–2004), Argentine writer